Stephen Uhalley Jr. (1930) is a Chinese historian, specializing in aerospace. He has written China and Christianity: Burdened Past, Hopeful Future, A History of the Chinese Communist Party, and Mao Tse-tung, a Critical Biography, as well as being a frequent contributor to multiple journals.

Biography 
Uhalley began studying history at San Bernardino Valley College where he received an Associate of Arts degree after two years (1952-1954). After, he received a bachelor's degree in history from the University of California, Riverside (1954–56). He then went to Claremont Graduate School and, after only one year, received a master's degree in International Relations (1956–57). After studying  and acting as a teaching assistant at Cornell University, he went on to the University of California, Berkeley where he received his Ph.D. in History (1958–67).

Before pursuing any academia, he served as a chief rifleman in the Amphibian Tractor Crew during the Korean War (1942–52). During the time he studied for his undergraduate degrees, however, he worked as a steelworker at the Kaiser Steel Corporation (1952–57). After receiving his graduate degree, he began work as an assistant representative at The Asia Foundation (1960–67). Following his Ph.D., he became an Assistant Professor at The University of Arizona (1967–68), and then an Associate Professor of History at Duke University (1968-1970).

He then became a Professor at the University of Hawaii at Manoa where he stayed for 25 years (1970–95), when the department had several important historians of Asia, and upon retirement, was made an Emeritus.

He co-edited the text, China and Christianity: Burdened Past, Hopeful Future: Burdened Past, Hopeful Future, with Xiaowin Wu.

He now lives in retirement, although still an active historian, in Novato, California.

Bibliography
 China and Christianity: Burdened Past, Hopeful Future: Burdened Past, Hopeful Future, coedited by  S Uhalley, X Wu (R. E. Sharpe, 2001, reprinted, Routledge, 2015),  
 A history of the Chinese communist party, by S Uhalley (Hoover Inst. Pr. 1988) 
 Mao Tse-tung: a critical biography, by S Uhalley - (New York, New Viewpoints,1975)

References

External links
 Research Gate

1930 births
Living people
Chinese historians
Claremont Graduate University alumni
Duke University faculty
San Bernardino Valley College alumni
University of Arizona faculty
UC Berkeley College of Letters and Science alumni
University of California, Riverside alumni
University of Hawaiʻi at Mānoa faculty